IFK Karlshamn is a Swedish football club located in Karlshamn.

Background

Idrottsföreningen Kamraterna Karlshamn were formed on 22 July 1906.   In addition to football other sports in the early years included athletics, swimming, rowing, shooting, tennis and gymnastics.  In the 1920s boxing, wrestling, handball, orienteering and bandy were added.

Football is now the main activity, the first match being played against a foreign team on 12 August 1907. IFK Karlshamn currently plays in Division 4 Blekinge which is the sixth tier of Swedish football. They play their home matches at the Vägga IP in Karlshamn.

The club is affiliated to Blekinge Fotbollförbund. IFK Karlshamn have competed in the Svenska Cupen on 20 occasions.

Season to season

Footnotes

External links
 IFK Karlshamn – Official website
 IFK Karlshamn on Facebook

Football clubs in Blekinge County
Association football clubs established in 1906
Bandy clubs established in 1906
1906 establishments in Sweden
Idrottsföreningen Kamraterna